Legros, LeGros or Le Gros is an ancient Norman/French surname. It literally means "the Large". Notable people with the surname or nickname include:

Surname
 Alphonse Legros (1837–1911), French painter and etcher
 Augustus Asplet Le Gros (1840–1877), Norman language poet from Jersey and a Jurat of the Royal Court of Jersey
 Bartholomew le Gros (before 1189–after 1253), prelate of French origin in the Kingdom of Hungary
 Fernand Legros (1931–1983), French art dealer
 James LeGros (b. 1962), American film and television actor
 Joseph Legros (1739–1793), French singer and composer
 Pierre Le Gros the Elder (1629–1714), French sculptor working primarily at Versailles
 Pierre Le Gros the Younger (1666–1719), French sculptor
 Raymond le Gros, Anglo-Norman commander
 Sous-Lieutenant Legros, who led the breach at Hougoumont
 William le Gros, 1st Earl of Albemarle (died 1179), Count of Aumale, Earl of York, and Lord of Holderness

Nickname
 Charles Le Gros, anglicized as Charles the Fat, (839–888), King of The Franks, Alemannia, Italy, East Francia, and West Francia
 Henry I of Navarre, also known as Henri le Gros (“Henry the Fat”), Count of Champagne, King of Navarre 1244-1274
 Louis VI Le Gros, King of France

References

French-language surnames